Manjapai (Yellow Bag) is a 2014 Indian Tamil-language comedy drama film written and directed by N. Ragavan. Produced by Thirupathi Brothers and  A Sarkunam Cinemaz. it stars Vimal, Rajkiran and Lakshmi Menon. The film saw its worldwide release on 6 June 2014. The film was remade in Telugu as Erra Bus with Vishnu Manchu and Dasari Narayana Rao and in Kannada as Mr. Mommaga.The movie was a surprise hit at the box office.

Plot
The film starts with Tamil (Vimal) who is raised single-handedly by his grandfather, Venkatasamy (Rajkiran) in a village, as his parents had committed suicide after eloping and giving birth to him. 25 years later the boy is working in a Chennai-based IT company, staying in a modern upmarket apartment. Tamil meets Karthika (Lakshmi Menon), a medical student using tricks to get to the front of the traffic signal. They fall in love at first sight, and end up being so engrossed in each other that they don't realise that the signal had gone green. The way Karthika tricks the police officer and gets away with it endears Tamil to Karthika. He follows her and in no time she reciprocates.

Meanwhile, at work, Tamil is selected to go to US for a three-month project and he brings Venkatasamy to the city so that they can spend time together before he leaves for US. Venkatasamy, coming from a rustic background, is unfamiliar with the urban lifestyle of people in a modern city.

He bathes and washes his clothes at a fountain, causing much embarrassment to Tamil which he does not share with Venkatasamy. He causes further hardship by disturbing Tamil during his date with Karthika, causing a breakup between them. Venkatasamy infuriates Tamil further by slapping Karthika's father, an Inspector of Police, for allowing his daughter to wear short clothes in public. Tamil pleads with Karthika and finally she forgives him.

Tamil spends several nights working on a project on his laptop. Venkatasamy assumes the laptop to be a sandwich grill and without knowing how to use it, puts it on the stove causing the laptop to explode into pieces, destroying the project work. Tamil is sacked from his job as a result but hides his anger from Venkatasamy.

Karthika motivates Tamil to complete the project on her computer. The old man feels really guilty of destroying the laptop, and buys him a new one by selling his ancestral wedding ring. Tamil thanks his grandfather and starts working on the project. He finishes the project and gets his job back.

Meanwhile, the old man helps a couple elope and get them married the same way he did with Tamil's parents. While Tamil is leaving to attend an interview to go to the US, Venkatasamy mocks the US flag at the US consulate and thinks that the whites are conquering India again. He creates a nuisance and both of them are arrested. When they come out of the station, Tamil goes for a second interview but his visa is rejected; he scolds his grandfather amidst a large crowd.

A girl, Pooja (Yuvina Parthavi), thinks that a piece of sweet laced with rat poison is a sweet that the old man gave her and faints after eating it. She was brought to the hospital and the old man is scolded in public for the second time by the girl's parents. The girl is cured thanks to the mixture of salt and tamarind water Venkatasamy gave Pooja before she was taken to the hospital, helping her to vomit and get rid of the poison.

When everyone wants to apologise and thank the old man, he goes missing and everyone starts to search for him. The old man is finally located but in a mentally challenged state. The film ends with Tamil regretting scolding his grandfather and crying while hugging him tightly.

Cast
 Vimal as Tamil
 Lakshmi Menon as Karthika 
 Rajkiran as Venkatasamy
 Yuvina Parthavi as Pooja
 Ravi Venkatraman as Karthika's father
 Kadhal Saravanan as Saravana
 Tiger Garden Thangadurai

Production
Initially, when first reported in June 2012, it was said that the film starring Vimal would be directed by A. Sargunam simultaneously with his other project Naiyaandi. Though he quickly denied reports, citing that his assistant Naveen Raghavan would make his directorial debut with the project, while he would co-produce the film with his brother Nandha Kumar. In December 2012, Lakshmi Menon and Rajkiran were added to the cast. In January 2013, Thirupathi Brothers acquired the rights of the film to produce the film on "first copy basis".

The film began shooting schedules in March 2013. On 2 April 2014, the shooting was wrapped up by filming a song sequence in Chettinad Health City, Kelambakkam.

Soundtrack
M. Ghibran was first signed to compose the soundtrack and score for the film, but he opted out of the project due to conflicting schedules. He was replaced by N. R. Raghunanthan. All lyrics were written by Yugabharathi. The songs were reused in Mr. Mommaga (2016).

Release
The satellite rights of the film were sold to Zee Thamizh.

Critical reception
Baradwaj Rangan wrote, "We’ve heard of movies that push the audience’s buttons. Manjapai grabs a live wire and gooses the audience’s behind — so desperate is it to evoke a reaction that it even has a little girl munching on rat poison". The Times of India gave 3 stars out of 5 and wrote, "Manja Pai is a good film with a solid message but if you aren't in the mood for gyan, then this movie might not be to your liking". Sify.com wrote, "Simplistic and sincere, Manja Pai has an old-fashioned plot and characters. It's got its heart in the right place, but sometimes that's not enough entertainment for today’s audience". Rediff gave it 2 stars out of 5 and wrote, "Manjapai, with its cliched plot, has absolutely nothing new to offer", calling it "a very predictable and overemotional tale".

Deccan Chronicle gave the film 2.5 stars out of 5 and wrote, "The movie is watchable for its clean content and sincere effort by debutant director Raghavan". Behindwoods gave the film 2.25 stars out of 5 saying "Manja Pai is a crude term that refers to rural migrants arriving to take on the big city. While there was an opportunity for director N. Raghavan to present them as is, focusing on their ability to adapt, the director resorts to stereotypes instead, not just with these sons of the soil, but also with city dwellers. This may evoke sympathy but its certainly far from a confidence building measure for other ‘old school’ migrants". Indiaglitz.com gave it a score of 2.25 out of 5 and wrote, "Manjapai is definitely not on the lines of the previous films of the prestigious Thirrupathi Brothers banner. But it will not disappoint you if you go to the movie halls expecting some unadulterated entertainment filled with humor and sentiment".

Remakes
Dasari Narayana Rao bought the Telugu remake rights of the film, he himself directed and acted in the main character of grandfather with Vishnu Manchu playing his grandson. The remake titled Errabus was released to negative reviews and became an average grosser. Raghavan will direct the Kannada remake titled Mr. Mommaga starring Ravi and Oviya, with Rangayana Raghu playing the grandpa's character.

Box office
The film collected  in Chennai in ten days.

References

External links
 

2014 films
Indian comedy-drama films
Tamil films remade in other languages
2014 comedy-drama films
2010s Tamil-language films
2014 directorial debut films